Agra gauze was a thin, translucent fabric with a loose open weave. The material was made of silk with a plain weave. Agra gauze was also known as Agre. The fabric is named after the Agra city. The cloth was used in trimmings.

Structure 
The Agra gauze is a stiffened silk gauze. It is very fine and transparent but strong, the structure is similar to a gauze fabric that is loose and open in weave. It is finished with a stiffener to make it a stiffened material.

See also 

 Trim (sewing)
 Lace
 Mesh
 Ninon

References 

Woven fabrics
Silk
Parts of clothing